Bednayel is a  local authority  in the Baalbek District of the Baalbek-Hermel Governorate in Lebanon.

History
In 1838, Eli Smith noted Bednaya's population as being predominantly  Metawileh.

References

Bibliography

External links
Bednayel, localiban

Populated places in Baalbek District
Shia Muslim communities in Lebanon